Edward Moses is an American physicist and is the former president of the Giant Magellan Telescope Organization. He is a past principal associate director for the National Ignition Facility & Photon Science Directorate, where he led the California-based NIF, the largest experimental science facility in the US and the world's most energetic laser, that hopes to demonstrate the first feasible example of usable nuclear fusion.

Ed Moses has 18 years of experience developing Department of Energy/National Nuclear Security Administration (DOE/NNSA) laser systems and 30 years of experience developing and managing complex laser systems and high-technology projects. As associate director (AD) for the National Ignition Facility (NIF) Program at Lawrence Livermore National Laboratory from 2005 to 2007, he was responsible for completing construction and bringing into full operation the world's largest optical instrument for achieving ignition in the laboratory and for studying inertial fusion energy.

Moses joined Lawrence Livermore in 1980, becoming program leader for Isotope Separation and Material Processing, and deputy AD for Lasers. From 1990 to 1995, he was a founding partner of Advanced Technology Applications, which advised clients on proposing on and designing high-technology projects. He returned to LLNL in 1995 as assistant AD for program development, Physics and Space Technology.

Moses received his bachelor's degree and doctorate from Cornell University in New York.

He has won numerous awards, including the 2003 NNSA Award of Excellence for Significant Contribution to Stockpile Stewardship, the 2004 DOE Award of Excellence for the first joint LLNL/Los Alamos National Laboratory experiments on NIF, and the D.S. Rozhdestvensky Medal for Outstanding Contributions to Lasers and Optical Sciences. He holds seven patents in laser technology and computational physics.

He is a Fellow of the American Association for the Advancement of Science and a member of the National Academy of Engineering (2009)

References

Living people
21st-century American physicists
Cornell University alumni
Year of birth missing (living people)